Lawrence James Fullan (born August 11, 1949) is a Canadian former ice hockey forward.

Signed as a free agent in 1972 by the Montreal Canadiens, Fullan never played with the parent club and was left exposed in the 1974 NHL Expansion Draft where he was claimed by the Washington Capitals.  He played just four games for the Capitals and spent most of the next two years in the minors before retiring from active professional play in 1976.

Fullan graduated from Cornell University in 1972, where he was also a member of the Quill and Dagger society.

Awards and honours

References

External links

1949 births
Living people
AHCA Division I men's ice hockey All-Americans
Canadian ice hockey forwards
Cornell Big Red men's ice hockey players
Ice hockey people from Toronto
Nova Scotia Voyageurs players
Richmond Robins players
Undrafted National Hockey League players
Washington Capitals players
NCAA men's ice hockey national champions